Maisonneuve may refer to:

People 
 Paul de Chomedey, Sieur de Maisonneuve (1612–1676), French officer who contributed to the foundation of Montreal
 Jules Germain François Maisonneuve (1809–1897), surgeon of 19th-century Paris
 Paul Maisonneuve (footballer) (born 1986), French football player

Other uses 
 Maisonneuve (electoral district), a former federal electoral district represented in the Canadian House of Commons, and located in the province of Quebec
 Maisonneuve (provincial electoral district), a former Quebec provincial electoral district, now part of Hochelaga-Maisonneuve
 Maisonneuve, Vienne, a commune of the Vienne département, in France
 Maisonneuve (magazine), a Canadian magazine
 Maisonneuve Monument, an 1895 monument in Montreal
 Maisonneuve fracture, a proximal fibular fracture associated with a distal tibial (ankle) fracture